Macrohaltica is a genus of flea beetles in the family Chrysomelidae. There are about 20 described species in Macrohaltica, found in Central and South America.

Species
These 20 species belong to the genus Macrohaltica:
 Macrohaltica aequifacta Bechyné & Bechyné, 1961 (Ecuador and Southern Colombia)
 Macrohaltica amethystina (Olivier, 1808) (Caribbean)
 Macrohaltica complicata (Harold, 1875) (Mexico)
 Macrohaltica convexicollis (Harold, 1880) (South America)
 Macrohaltica costata (Erichson, 1847) (South America)
 Macrohaltica crypta Santisteban, 2006 (Costa Rica and Panamá)
 Macrohaltica gregaria (Harold, 1875) (Colombia and Venezuela)
 Macrohaltica guatemalensis (Jacoby, 1884) (Mexico)
 Macrohaltica jamaicensis (Fabricius, 1792) (Caribbean, Central and South America)
 Macrohaltica janthina (Blanchard, 1851) (Chile)
 Macrohaltica languida (Harold, 1875) (South America)
 Macrohaltica mexicana (Jacoby, 1884) (Mexico)
 Macrohaltica papas Asenjo & Figueroa, 2017 (Colombia)
 Macrohaltica patruelis (Harold, 1875) (México and Guatemala)
 Macrohaltica plicata (Erichson, 1847) (South America)
 Macrohaltica puruchuco Asenjo & Figueroa, 2017 (South America)
 Macrohaltica salvadorensis (Bechyné & Bechyné, 1960) (Central America)
 Macrohaltica steihanseni Asenjo & Figueroa, 2017 (South America)
 Macrohaltica transversa (Germar, 1824) (South America)
 Macrohaltica weyrauchi (Bechyné, 1956) (South America)

References

Alticini
Chrysomelidae genera